The 1980 North Rhine-Westphalia state election was held on 11 May 1980 to elect the 9th Landtag of North Rhine-Westphalia. The outgoing government was a coalition of the Social Democratic Party (SPD) and Free Democratic Party (FDP) led by Minister-President Johannes Rau.

The result was a clear victory for the SPD, who won an absolute majority of 106 seats in the Landtag with 48.4% of the vote. The opposition Christian Democratic Union (CDU) declined to 43.2% and remained steady on 95 seats. The SPD's majority was ensured by the failure of the FDP to re-enter parliament: they fell just short of the 5% electoral threshold and lost all their seats. The SPD went on to form government alone for the first time in the state's history; Johannes Rau was re-elected Minister-President by the Landtag on 4 June.

Electoral system
The Landtag was elected via mixed-member proportional representation. 151 members were elected in single-member constituencies via first-past-the-post voting, and fifty then allocated using compensatory proportional representation. A single ballot was used for both. An electoral threshold of 5% of valid votes is applied to the Landtag; parties that fall below this threshold are ineligible to receive seats.

Background

In the previous election held on 4 May 1975, the CDU remained the largest party with an improved lead over the SPD, while the FDP made small gains. The governing coalition retained its majority and was subsequently renewed. In September 1978, SPD parliamentary leader and culture minister Johannes Rau replaced Heinz Kühn as Minister-President.

Parties
The table below lists parties represented in the 8th Landtag of North Rhine-Westphalia.

Results

External links

</ref>

References

Notes

Elections in North Rhine-Westphalia